Sarniguet is a commune in the Hautes-Pyrénées department in southwestern France.

Geography
Sarniguet is located on the left bank of the Adour River, which flows at highly variable rates through the vast and fertile plain of the same name. The patchwork terrain of Sarniguet consists heavily of plains surrounded by forested borders of alder and Italian poplar.

See also
Communes of the Hautes-Pyrénées department

References

Communes of Hautes-Pyrénées